"Psycho" is the first single released from the Lords of the Underground's debut album, Here Come the Lords. Produced by Marley Marl with scratches by DJ Lord Jazz, "Psycho" became a minor hit, peaking at 17 on the Hot Rap Singles.

The song was recorded and mixed at Marley Marl's production studio, Marley's House of Hits, and was mastered at the legendary studio, The Hit Factory.

Single track listing

A-Side
"Psycho" (12'' Rubber Room Mix)- 4:08
"Psycho" (Asylum Dub)- 4:08
"Psycho" (Radio Mix)- 3:59

B-Side
"Sleep for Dinner" (LP Mix)- 4:30
"Check It" (LP Mix)- 3:35
"Psycho" (Instrumental)- 4:08

Charts

1992 debut singles
1992 songs
Lords of the Underground songs
Elektra Records singles